NA-49 Attock-I is a constituency for the National Assembly of Pakistan.

Members of Parliament

1970–1977: NW-30 Campbellpur-I

1977: NA-41 Campbellpur-I

1985–2002: NA-41 Attock-I

2002–2018: NA-57 Attock-I

2018-2022: NA-55 Attock-I

Detailed Results

Election 2002 

General elections were held on 10 Oct 2002. Malik Amin Aslam Khan of PML-Q won by 39,921 votes.

Election 2008 

The result of general election 2008 in this constituency is given below.

Sheikh Aftab Ahmed succeeded in the election 2008 and became the member of National Assembly.

Election 2013 

General elections were held on 11 May 2013. Sheikh Aftab Ahmed of PML-N won by 59,920 votes and became the  member of National Assembly.

Election 2018

General elections were held on 25 July 2018.

See also
 NA-48 Islamabad-III
 NA-50 Attock-II

References

External links 
Election result's official website

55
55